Jacob's Ladder is a staircase to heaven from a dream of Jacob described in the Old Testament.

Jacob's Ladder may also refer to:

Film and television
 Jacob's Ladder (1990 film), a horror film
 Jacob's Ladder (2019 film), a remake of the 1990 film
 "Jacob's Ladder", an episode of the television series Rectify

Literature
 Jacob's Ladder (Oppenheim novel), a 1921 novel by E. Phillips Oppenheim
 Jacob's Ladder (Keaney novel), a 2005 novel by Brian Keaney
 Jacob's Ladder, a 1998 novel by Donald McCaig
 Jacob's Ladder, a 2003 autobiography by Colin Mackay
 Jacob's Ladder (Yakov's Ladder), a 2015 novel by Lyudmila Ulitskaya

Music 
 Die Jakobsleiter, an early 1920s unfinished oratorio by Arnold Schoenberg
 Jacob's Ladder (the Filthy Tongues album)
 Jacob's Ladder (Brad Mehldau album)

Songs
 "We Are Climbing Jacob's Ladder", a traditional African American slave spiritual
 "Jacob's Ladder", a 1965 adaptation of "We Are Climbing Jacob's Ladder" by the Staple Singers from Freedom Highway
 "Jacob's Ladder", a 1978 song by Cedar Walton from Animation
 "Jacob's Ladder" (Rush song) (1980)
 "Jacob's Ladder", a 1984 song by The Monochrome Set
 "Jacob's Ladder" (Huey Lewis and the News song) (1987)
 "Jacob's Ladder" (Mark Wills song) (1996)
 "Jacob's Ladder (Not in My Name)", a 2002 song by Chumbawamba
 "Jacob's Ladder", a 2003 song by Converge from Unloved and Weeded Out
 "Jacob's Ladder", a 2005 song by Chimp Spanner from Imperium Vorago
 "Jacob's Ladder", a 2005 song by Patrick Wolf from Wind in the Wires
 "Jacob's Ladder", a 2006 song by Fucked Up from Hidden World
 "Jacob's Ladder", a 2006 song by Bruce Springsteen and the Sessions Band from We Shall Overcome: The Seeger Sessions
 "Jacob's Ladder", a 2013 song by Terence Blanchard from Magnetic

Places

Australia 
 Jacob's Ladder, Brisbane, Queensland
 Jacob's Ladder, a road to the top of Ben Lomond, Tasmania
 Jacob's Ladder, Kings Park, Western Australia

New Zealand 
 Jacobs Ladder Bridge, a bridge between Westhaven and Saint Marys Bay, in Auckland

United Kingdom 
 Jacob's Ladder, Derbyshire a scenic path on Kinder Scout in the Peak District of England
 Jacob's Ladder, a set of steps and a beach in Sidmouth, Devon, England
 Jacob's Ladder, a scenic path in Cheddar Gorge in Somerset, England
 Jacob's Ladder, a set of stone steps at Devil's Bridge, Ceredigion, Wales
 Jacob's Ladder, a set of stone steps in Edinburgh, Scotland
 Jacob's Ladder, a flight of granite steps in Falmouth, Cornwall

Overseas Territories
 Jacob's Ladder (Saint Helena), a Grade I listed staircase from Jamestown, Saint Helena, up Ladder Hill

United States 
 Jacob's Ladder, a section of U.S. Route 20 as it crosses the Berkshire Hills between the towns of Chester and Lee in western Massachusetts
 Jacob's Ladder Trail, a hiking trail to Lone Peak in Utah's Wasatch Range

Other uses 
 Jacob's ladder (electrical), a device for producing high-voltage traveling arcs
 Jacob's ladder (flower), a genus of flowering plants
 Jacob's ladder (knife), a three-part pocket knife
 Jacob's Ladder (Moskos), a tempera painting by Elias Moskos
 Jacob's ladder (nautical), specialized ladders used at sea
 Jacob's ladder (toy), a folk toy consisting of blocks on strings that, when held at one end, appear to cascade down the strings
 Jacob's ladder surface, a noncompact surface in mathematics
 Jacobs's ladder, the European name for a solo string figure
 Crepuscular rays or Jacob's Ladder, rays of sunlight that appear to radiate from a point in the sky

See also
 Ladder of Jacob, a pseudepigraphic text of the Old Testament